John Wiley may refer to:

John Wiley & Sons, a publishing company
John A. Wiley (1843–1909), Pennsylvania businessman, National Guard and Civil War soldier
John Cooper Wiley (1893–1967), US foreign service officer and ambassador
John D. Wiley (born 1942), former Chancellor of the University of Wisconsin–Madison
John F. Wiley (1920–2013), American football player and coach
John M. Wiley (1841–1912), U.S. Representative from New York
John Wiley Bryant (born 1947), Texas politician
John Wiley Jr., Gone with the Wind expert
John Wiley (politician) (1927–1987), South African cricketer and politician

See also
John W. Willey (1797–1841), American politician and first mayor of Cleveland, Ohio, 1836–1837
John Wyly (died 1400), MP for Marlborough
John Wylie (disambiguation)
John Wyllie (disambiguation)

Wiley, John